Schubert is a single-member electoral district for the South Australian House of Assembly covering an area of 2,017.8 km². It is named after Max Schubert, the winemaker of Penfolds Grange Hermitage. The Barossa Valley area was first represented by the seat of Barossa. The seat of Custance was abolished and recreated as Schubert in the 1994 redistribution and first contested at the 1997 election. Schubert currently covers the Barossa Valley area, the northern parts of the Adelaide Hills and much of the inner north and northwest plains bordering Adelaide. Areas covered include Eden Valley, Kangaroo Flat, Nuriootpa, Lyndoch, Springton, Tanunda, Wasleys and Williamstown.

Members for Schubert

Election results

Notes

References
 ECSA profile for Schubert: 2018
 ABC profile for Schubert: 2018
 Poll Bludger profile for Schubert: 2018

1997 establishments in Australia
Electoral districts of South Australia